Carnival Eats is a Canadian television series about various eating establishments at carnivals in Canada and the United States. The series features host Noah Cappe as he travels to the many carnivals, state fairs and festivals to sample a variety of unique culinary creations available only at these aptly named "gastronomic freak shows". The show premiered on August 18, 2014 and airs on Fridays at 8:00 p.m. EDT.

The series airs on Food Network in Canada, and on the Cooking Channel and Great American Country in the United States.

Carnival Eats is currently airing on the Cooking Channel on Sundays at 9pm EST.

Episodes

Series overview

Season 1 (2014–15)

Season 2 (2015)

Season 3 (2016)

Season 4 (2017)

Season 5 (2017–18)

Season 6 (2018)

Season 7 (2019)

Season 8 (2019–20)

Season 9 (2020–21)

Season 10 (2022)

References

External links
 
 Foodnetwork CA website
 
 

2010s Canadian cooking television series
2014 Canadian television series debuts
Food Network (Canadian TV channel) original programming
Television series by Entertainment One
Food travelogue television series